e-st@r-II (Educational Satellite @ Polytechnic University of Turin 2) is a miniaturized satellite designed and built by Polytechnic University of Turin, as part of the "Fly Your Satellite" program of the European Space Agency.

Launch and deployment 
It is a  CubeSat satellite, placed in orbit by Arianespace with Soyuz Booster, VS14 flight, on April 25, 2016, at 21:02 GMT (23:02 CEST) from Europe's spaceport in Kourou, French Guiana. The main payload of the launch was Sentinel-1B from program Copernicus and  Microscope designed by the CNES, the French space agency.

In addition to e-st@r-II there were tewo other 1U CubeSats (AAUSAT 4 and OUFTI 1) that were manifested aboard the Soyuz launch mission. These small satellites, each measuring just 10 × 10 × 11 cm in height, were  developed by teams of university students through ESA programs.

E-st@r-II is a 1U CubeSat developed for demonstrating the autonomous active attitude control capabilities based on magnetic actuation: in fact, the payload is an Active Attitude Determination and Control System. The commissioning phase foresees that the payload is deactivated leaving the satellite in its free tumbling motion, without any attitude stabilization. The A-ADCS starts its work when commanded from GCS, controlling the angular velocities and the attitude of the satellite.

The primary scientific objectives of e-st@r-II mission are:
 to demonstrate the capability of autonomous determination, control and manoeuver, through the development and test in orbit of an A-ADCS entirely designed and manufactured by students
 to test in orbit COTS technology and self-made hardware

E-st@r-II is a follow-on of e-st@r-I, the first Italian CubeSat and the first satellite of Politecnico di Torino to be inserted on orbit.
More than 30 students worked on this project, using a unique opportunity of hands-on experience on space applications.
It will demonstrate the ability of determining (with gyros and magnetometers) and actively controlling its attitude.
The bus functionalities, as a basis for other CubeSats, will be demonstrated: it is a step towards future missions and applications.

Currently the team that developed the satellite, the CubeSatTeam of Politecnico di Torino, is actively working on the development of the  Next model:  3-STAR, a 3U CubeSat.

Communications Issues
Once deployed into orbit, e-st@r-II was designed to begin transmitting signals to Earth approximately 30 minutes after activation. Signals could be picked up by anyone with common amateur radio equipment. 
To celebrate the launch of this second CubeSat, members of the world amateur radio community were invited in a contest to listen for the satellite. While transmissions from the satellite were received by multiple ground stations following deployment, the received signal was not strong enough for either radio amateurs or the satellite's dedicated ground station to demodulate. An analysis of the received signal strength gave figures up to 15 dB lower than what was estimated from pre-launch link budget calculations. Ground tests using prototype hardware and flight spares were able to determine that the antenna likely did deploy correctly and the probable cause of the discrepancy was attributed to improper assembly of the satellite's RF hardware, leading to a large degree of mismatch loss. Ultimately, stations employing high-gain antennas were able to demodulate e-st@r-II's transmitted data packets and the error did not constitute a mission failure.

See also

Politecnico di Torino
e-st@r
List of CubeSats

References

External links
 Official Site
 E-st@r-II Position
Data

Satellites orbiting Earth
CubeSats
Student satellites
Satellites of Italy
Spacecraft launched in 2016
2016 in Italy
Spacecraft launched by Soyuz-2 rockets